Eugena Washington is an American model. She was born in Columbia, South Carolina, United States. She was the last eliminated on America's Next Top Model, Cycle 7. In Playboy magazine's post-nude era, she was the first Playmate of the Year, and was the last to be announced by Hugh Hefner at the Playboy Mansion. She appeared in the music video of rapper B.o.B's single "Nothin' on You".

Career

America's Next Top Model

Washington was the fourth (after Melrose Bickerstaff, Jaeda Young and Michelle Babin) girl to be selected for the seventh cycle of America's Next Top Model. Over her stay, Washington received one first call-out and survived the bottom two twice over Monique Calhoun and Brooke Miller who were both eliminated in their only ever bottom two appearance upon Washington's stay. She also won three challenges where two of them Washington selected CariDee English and Jaeda Young after winning the Covergirl challenge and Amanda Babin after winning the flamenco dancing challenge. The judges eliminated Washington eleventh (finishing third in overall rank) in Barcelona during her third collective bottom two appearance which Melrose Bickerstaff had survived for the second time round (the first being over Christian Evans who was the first eliminee) after CariDee English was selected to be the first finalist and eventually won.

Print work
Washington was the Playboy Playmate of the Month for December 2015 and Playmate of the Year 2016.  She was the third African American to be so named.  She was the first Playmate of the Year after Playboy eliminated its Centerfold.

In May, 2016, she was the last Playmate of the Year to be announced by Hugh Hefner at the Playboy Mansion.

Acting
Washington has appeared in The Bold and the Beautiful and The Perfect Match (2016).

Other
Washington also appears in a McDonald's cafe commercial along with American R&B artist Dwele. She appeared in the video for B.o.B single "Nothin' On You".  She was named one of the influencers for Cîroc "Lets Get It" Campaign in 2016.
Washington was also a contestant on cycle 7 of "America's Next Top Model".

References

External links

Fusion Model Portfolio

1984 births
Living people
American female models
America's Next Top Model contestants
2010s Playboy Playmates
Playboy Playmates of the Year
21st-century American women